The VL class are a class of Australian diesel locomotives built by Avteq, Melbourne for Chicago Freight Car Leasing Australia between February 2007 and March 2009.

They have been hired to a variety of operators and operated in New South Wales, Victoria, South Australia, Western Australia and the Northern Territory. They are named after notable racehorses that have won the Melbourne Cup.

Multiple VL class locomotives have been transferred over to the Broad Gauge for use by QUBE. Most recently, VL353 was converted in January 2021. VL357 was converted to BG in November 2021, and VL351 was converted in February 2022.

Status table

References

Diesel-electric locomotives of Australia
Co-Co locomotives
Railway locomotives introduced in 2007
Broad gauge locomotives in Australia
Standard gauge locomotives of Australia